Kuroshiodaphne phaeacme is a species of sea snail, a marine gastropod mollusk in the family Raphitomidae.

Description

Distribution
This marine species was found on the Naska and Sala y Gomes Ridges, Southeast Pacific

References

 Sysoev, A. V. "Gastropods of the fam. Turridae (Gastropoda: Toxoglossa) from the underwater Sala y Gomez Ridge." Transactions of the PP Shirshov Institute of Oceanology [Trudy Instituta Okeanologii] 124 (1990): 245-260.
 Parin, N. V., A. N. Mironov, and K. N. Nesis. "Biology of the Nazca and Sala y Gomez submarine ridges, an outpost of the Indo-West Pacific fauna in the eastern Pacific Ocean: composition and distribution of the fauna, its communities and history." Advances in Marine Biology. Vol. 32. Academic Press, 1997. 145-242.

External links
 Census of Marine Life (2012). SYNDEEP: Towards a first global synthesis of biodiversity, biogeography and ecosystem function in the deep sea. Unpublished data (datasetID: 59)
 

phaeacme
Gastropods described in 1990